The 1998 Salem Open was a men's tennis tournament played on Hard courts in Hong Kong that was part of the International Series of the 1998 ATP Tour. It was the 23rd edition of the tournament and was held from 6 April through 12 April 1998. Eighth-seeded Kenneth Carlsen won the singles title.

Finals

Singles

 Kenneth Carlsen defeated  Byron Black, 6–2, 6–0
 It was Carlsen's first singles title of his career.

Doubles

 Byron Black /  Alex O'Brien defeated  Neville Godwin /  Tuomas Ketola, 7–5, 6–1

References

External links
 ITF tournament edition details

Salem Open
1998
1998 in Hong Kong sport
1998 in Chinese tennis